Balin Kuli is an Indian politician. He was elected to the Lok Sabha, the lower house of the Parliament of India, as a member of the Indian National Congress.

References

External links
 Official biographical sketch in Parliament of India website

India MPs 1991–1996
Lok Sabha members from Assam
1947 births
Living people